Rhythm of War is an epic fantasy novel written by American author Brandon Sanderson and the fourth book in The Stormlight Archive series. It was published by Tor Books on November 17, 2020. Rhythm of War consists of one prologue, 117 chapters, 12 interludes and an epilogue. It is preceded by Oathbringer. It is currently both the longest Sanderson novel and longest in the series at 455,891 words, though Oathbringer has a higher page count.

As with Kaladin in The Way of Kings, Shallan in Words of Radiance, and Dalinar in Oathbringer, Rhythm of War has a sequence of flashback chapters, this time for characters Eshonai and Venli.

The book features illustrations of four Heralds, as well as illustrations of all the True  who form Nahel Bonds save for the Bondsmith . As with its Stormlight Archive predecessors, the unabridged audiobook is read by narration team Michael Kramer and Kate Reading.

A sequel, Knights of Wind and Truth, is set for a November 2024 release.

Plot
The prologue is from Navani's perspective, in which she recalls Gavilar's death and his involvement with strange spheres of light. The book begins with Kaladin traveling to his hometown of Hearthstone, to rescue the citizens and pick up a famous Herdazian general, The Mink. Navani,
Dalinar, and many Radiants arrive on a flying machine to assist Kaladin in evacuating the city. While the evacuation begins, the Radiants get into a battle with the Fused, which ends with no conclusive winner. Meanwhile, Kaladin is baited into a fight with his former friend Moash, who somehow induces Kaladin to have visions of traumatic experiences. Kaladin escapes to the flying machine and they fly away with the townspeople on board. While returning, Navani is contacted by a mysterious stranger, who tells her that creating magic devices called fabrials is unethical and wrong. After returning to Narak, Dalinar relieves Kaladin of duty due to his battleshock and increasing depression. Kaladin searches for a way to continue serving those around him without fighting and starts assisting his father in the infirmary, eventually finding greater purpose in helping those with mental issues through group therapy and more progressive treatments.

Meanwhile, Shallan and her split personalities infiltrate the Sons of Honor to curry favor with Mraize and the Ghostbloods, a clandestine organization that hints at secrets beyond the world of Roshar. During the mission, Shallan discovers a hidden notebook mentioning mysterious terms (referring to other worlds in the Cosmere universe) and considers breaking free of the Ghostbloods. Mraize sends her on one final mission, promising her full Ghostblood membership and knowledge after she finds and kills Restares in Lasting Integrity, the  base in Shadesmar. Listening to the Mink's advice, Shallan, Adolin, and a few Radiants head to Shadesmar as diplomatic envoys to encourage more  to bond with humans, while Dalinar and Jasnah set off to fight on the Emul battlefront in a strategic maneuver and leave Navani and Kaladin behind at their home base of Urithiru to manage matters. Taravangian supports the Emul battlefront, plotting for his troops to betray the rest of the human army on Odium's orders, though Dalinar foresees and plans ahead for this betrayal. After the battle, Taravangian is captured as a traitor and begins to see ways to thwart Odium through Nightblood, the black sword. 

Led by Raboniel, who claims to have found a way to end the war permanently, the Fused invade and take control of Urithiru by corrupting the Sibling, the tower , which causes all the Radiants in the tower except Kaladin and Lift to fall unconscious. Navani and the Sibling manage to activate a shield before the Sibling is fully corrupted, powered by four hidden nodes. Navani surrenders and is enlisted by Raboniel to aid in her research. Together, they discover that Voidlight and Stormlight can be mixed into Warlight. They also find anti- types of light, something that can permanently kill  and Fused: a discovery that can end the cycle of war. Aided by Navani, the Sibling, and Dabbid, Kaladin escapes with an unconscious Teft to a hidden room in the upper levels of Urithiru. Kaladin's depression grows increasingly worse, with Moash and Odium sending him visions to drive him to suicide, but keeps busy by defending the nodes under the instruction of Navani and the Sibling. Venli, Rlain, and Dabbid help to take care of Teft and free Lift from the Fused, who can wake the unconscious Radiants with her healing powers. 

Increasingly suspicious, Dalinar looks at Urithiru through the Stormfather and realizes the tower has been occupied by the enemy. He decides to seek out another Bondsmith, Ishar the Herald, to increase his powers and fight back. However, Ishar has been driven insane through the centuries and attacks Dalinar. He is defeated by Szeth and temporarily sane, tells Dalinar to meet him in Shinovar for further instruction. Meanwhile, Shallan and Adolin travel through Shadesmar. Adolin undertakes a legal battle in Lasting Integrity to convince the  that humans are worth bonding again. Shallan realizes that Restares is actually Kalak, a Herald, and judge of the trial. She attempts to assassinate him but in doing so, releases her repressed memory of killing her first  Testament. Adolin's dead Shardblade, Mayalaran, speaks at the trial, revealing that the ancient  chose to sacrifice themselves with the Knights Radiant. Shallan ends her association with the Ghostbloods and sets herself firmly against them. 

Navani, Kaladin, Teft, and Lift fight to wake the Radiants and liberate Urithiru. Teft and Lift infiltrate the infirmary while Kaladin provides a distraction by fighting one of the Fused outside. However, Moash is waiting and kills Teft, then throws his corpse to Kaladin. Kaladin's father is thrown off the tower by another Fused. Consumed by grief, Kaladin jumps off the tower into the highstorm, where he is saved by Dalinar and the Stormfather. He states the Fourth Ideal and saves his father, then returns to reclaim the tower. Dalinar later recruits Kaladin to join him in Shinovar to help treat Ishar's mental issues. Navani encounters Moash during her escape attempt. He tries to kill Navani but she bonds with the Sibling, becoming a Bondsmith; she repels Moash and reverses the corruption of the tower through anti-Voidlight. Blinded, Moash flees Urithiru and is later reclaimed by Odium. The remaining Fused attack the infirmary; Venli teams up with Rlain, Leshwi, and the humans to protect the unconscious Radiants, showing that the singers and humans can live in harmony. Dalinar meets with Odium in a vision, where Odium, shaken by the loss of Urithiru and the failure of so many of his plans, agrees to a contest of champions. Dalinar is able to manipulate Odium into swearing that whoever wins, Odium will enforce an end to the war and withdraw his influence from Roshar entirely. Szeth leaves Dalinar to pursue his next Ideal and visits Taravangian in his cell, intending to kill him once and for all. Before he can do so, Odium pulls Taravangian (and unintentionally Nightblood) into a vision, where Taravangian stabs Odium and kills his Vessel (the person who serves as the mind directing Odium's power), taking its place. The newly born Odium (who is still bound by the old Odium's agreements) tricks Wit, leaving him unaware of Odium's new identity.

Development
The writing process for the book started in January 2019, with a publication date planned for 2020. Before deciding the title would be Rhythm of War, the working title for the novel was The Song of Changes, which Brandon stated was never meant to be the final title. Later it was announced that the book would be released on November 17, 2020.

Originally the book was to feature flashbacks from the point of view of Eshonai, with Venli taking center stage in the present-day timeline. Eventually Sanderson decided on mixed flashbacks, with part set from Eshonai's perspective, while the other part set from Venli's.

Sanderson has stated that the Wit epilogue of Rhythm of War is something he has been particularly looking forward to for a long time. He also stated there would be a time-jump between book three and four. While the title suggests greater focus on characters from the so-called 'singer culture', the remaining protagonists, including Kaladin Stormblessed, Shallan Davar, Dalinar Kholin, Navani, Adolin, as well as Bridge Four members also feature prominently. Narratives from the perspective of Szeth and Taravangian highlight many of the interludes.

The American cover was revealed on August 17, 2020.

Readings and previews
Sanderson shared multiple fragments of Rhythm of War before publication. On July 23, Tor started the publication of preview chapters on their website. Previews include:

 Two versions of a Lirin point-of-view section
 A recorded reading of a Venli POV section
 A fragment of the Navani prologue
 A very early version of an Eshonai flashback scene
 A Lift interlude
 A Syl interlude released in the July 2020 newsletter

Publication
The book was published by Tor on November 17, 2020.

On July 12, 2020, Sanderson announced on his official Twitter account that he had finished the book and turned in the manuscript. At roughly 460,000 words, Rhythm of War is slightly longer than its predecessor, Oathbringer, including a prologue, epilogue, 117 chapters, and multiple interludes.

Audiobook
The audiobook version of the book was released on the same day as the hardcover version, and is read by narrator team Michael Kramer and Kate Reading, who also read The Way of Kings, Words of Radiance, Oathbringer and several other books written by Sanderson.

References

External links
 Brandon Sanderson's official website
Coppermind Rhythm of War Site

2020 American novels
The Stormlight Archive
Tor Books books
Books with cover art by Michael Whelan
Novels set on fictional planets